John Langdon Rand (October 28, 1861 – November 19, 1942) was an American politician and jurist in the state of Oregon. He served as the 22nd Chief Justice of the Oregon Supreme Court. Overall he was on Oregon’s highest court from 1921 to 1942 serving as chief justice three times. A native of New Hampshire, he served in the Oregon State Senate prior to his judicial career.

Early life
John Rand was born October 28, 1861, in Portsmouth, New Hampshire, to John Sullivan Rand and the former Elvira Wallis Odiorne. John junior was educated in Portsmouth and attended Smith Preparatory School there before enrolling at Dartmouth College. Rand graduated from Dartmouth in 1883 and moved to Walla Walla, Washington where he was a professor at Whitman College until 1885. That year he was accepted in Washington's, then still a territory, bar.

Legal career
Then in 1886 he moved to Baker City, Oregon, and was accepted into the Oregon State Bar and began serving as that city's attorney until 1888. From 1888 to 1890 he served as the county’s district attorney. Then in 1902 he was elected to a four-year term as a Republican to the Oregon State Senate representing Baker, Harney, and Malheur counties. After his stint in the Senate, Rand returned to private law practice.

On October 18, 1921, John Rand was appointed by Oregon Governor Ben W. Olcott to replace justice Henry L. Benson on the Oregon Supreme Court after Benson died in office. He won a full six-year term in the 1922 elections, and was re-elected in 1928, 1934, and 1940. While on the bench of the state supreme court he served as chief justice from 1927 to 1929, 1933 to 1935, and 1939 to 1941 before dying in office on November 19, 1942.

Rand was involved in a prolonged legal and political controversy in the late 1920s. The controversy began with a complex legal battle over the estate of E. Henry Wemme, a wealthy immigrant to Oregon. One attorney in the case, former state senator George W. Joseph, accused opposing counsel Thomas Mannix of engaging in a mining deal with Justice Rand, while the case was being heard. Ultimately both Joseph and Mannix were disbarred, prompting Joseph to successfully seek the Republican nomination for Governor of Oregon.

Family
On July 23, 1895, Rand married Edith G. Packwood, and they had two sons. Edith was the daughter of William H. Packwood who served at the Oregon Constitutional Convention in 1857.

See also
Odiorne Point State Park

References

1942 deaths
1861 births
Dartmouth College alumni
Oregon state senators
Chief Justices of the Oregon Supreme Court
Politicians from Baker City, Oregon
Politicians from Portsmouth, New Hampshire
District attorneys in Oregon
Justices of the Oregon Supreme Court